The United States House of Representatives elections in California, 1934 was an election for California's delegation to the United States House of Representatives, which occurred as part of the general election of the House of Representatives on November 6, 1934. Democrats gained three districts while losing one.

Overview

Delegation composition

Results
Final results from the Clerk of the House of Representatives:

District 1

District 2

District 3

District 4

District 5

District 6

District 7

District 8

District 9

District 10

District 11

District 12

District 13

District 14

District 15

District 16

District 17

District 18

District 19

District 20

See also
74th United States Congress
Political party strength in California
Political party strength in U.S. states
1934 United States House of Representatives elections

References
California Elections Page
Office of the Clerk of the House of Representatives

External links
California Legislative District Maps (1911-Present)
RAND California Election Returns: District Definitions

1934
California United States House of Representatives
1934 California elections